Vicente Uribe Galdeano (30 December 1902 – 11 July 1961) was a Spanish metalworker and politician who became a member of the executive of the Communist Party of Spain (PCE). He served as Minister of Agriculture during the Spanish Civil War (1936–1939) for the Republican faction. He went into exile in Mexico during World War II (1939–1945), then lived in France and Czechoslovakia after the war. He was disgraced in 1956 during the post-Stalinist power struggle.

Life

Early years
Vicente Uribe Galdeano was born in Bilbao in 1897. He became a metalworker, and in 1923 joined the Communist Party of Spain. He was a member of the party's executive from 1927.
He married Teresa García, and they had five children.
In 1932 the Spanish Communist Party made a major change in direction when it abandoned the Comintern slogan "Workers' and Peasants' Government" and adopted "Defense of the Republic".
Uribe was among the new leaders of the party who succeeded José Bullejos.
The others were José Díaz, Antonio Mije, Juan Astigarrabía and Jesús Hernández Tomás.
Uribe represented the PCE in creating the draft electoral manifesto of the Popular Front for the elections on 16 February 1936.

Civil War
After the start of the Spanish Civil War Uribe was appointed Minister of Agriculture in the cabinet of Francisco Largo Caballero on 5 September 1936.
For tactical reasons the communists supported small businessmen and peasants. In September 1936 Uribe said,

On 7 October 1936 Uribe issued a decree seizing for the state all rural properties of anyone who had been involved in the military insurrection, with no compensation. The estates were given to organizations of peasants and agricultural workers, who could decide whether to cultivate them collectively or individually. Small cultivators with leased estates below a certain size were given perpetual use of their land.
Mundo Obrero commented, "This decree breaks the foundation of the semifeudal power of the big landlords who, in order to maintain their brutal caste privileges and to perpetuate salaries of two pesetas a day and labor from dawn to dusk, have unleashed the bloody war that is devastating Spain."
Uribe's decree, represented as revolutionary, was in fact simply recognizing changes that had already occurred.
The anarchist CNT and socialist FNTT were both intensely hostile to the decree, with its protection of the rights of small owners.
Throughout the war Uribe refused to give the agricultural collectives a permanent legal status.
In the spring of 1937 the PCE started to support return of collectivized land to landowners who had not supported Franco's rebellion, and to tenant farmers and sharecroppers, who often held right-wing views.

A decree of 9 November 1936 established a Higher War Council consisting of the socialists Largo Caballero (War) and Indalecio Prieto (Air and Navy), the communist Uribe (Agriculture) and communist sympathiser Julio Álvarez del Vayo (Foreign Affairs), the Left Republican Julio Just Gimeno (Public Works) and the CNT-FAI Juan García Oliver (Justice).
Largo Caballero, a socialist,  found himself increasingly isolated, and by February 1937 was demanding that his ministers confirm their support for him, particularly the communist ministers Uribe and Jesús Hernández Tomás.
On 8 March 1937 the Italians began an advance on the Guadalajara sector, which at first overcame all resistance. Uribe and Hernández Tomás demanded the resignation of the chief of the central general staff, General Toribio Martínez Cabrera. The advanced was checked, but Martínez Cabrera was replaced.
In April 1937 Franco launched a major thrust in the north of Spain with German and Italian assistance. 
The Higher War Council designated Uribe to investigate the situation. He was accompanied by the Soviet General Vladimir Gorev.

On 15 May 1937 Uribe and Hernández caused the collapse of Largo Caballero's government. 
The trigger was a disagreement in a cabinet meeting over the May Days violence in Barcelona, which the communists blamed on the Anarchist CNT and FAI and the dissident communist POUM.
They demanded that the POUM be banned and its leaders arrested as "fascists".
Largo Caballero refused to act, and most of the ministers walked out of the meeting.
On 17 May 1937 Manuel Azaña dismissed Largo and named Juan Negrín Prime Minister of Spain.
Negrín's government included the socialists Indalecio Prieto (War, Navy and Air) and Julián Zugazagoitia  (Interior), the communists Hernández Tomás (Education) and Uribe (Agriculture), the Republicans José Giral (Foreign Affairs) and Bernardo Giner de los Ríos (Public Works), the Basque Manuel de Irujo (Justice) and the Catalan Nationalist Jaume Aiguader (Labor).
The Higher War Council was reorganized and consisted of Negrín, Giral, Uribe and Prieto.

In the second Negrín cabinet, formed on 5 April 1938, Uribe was the only communist representative.
According to Togliatti, the tactic of withdrawing from the government was to "convince English and French public opinion that the Communists are not interested in the conquest of power, not even in Spain, where we could do so with comparative ease. ... In this way, we shall strengthen Anglo-French ties with the Soviets. If Hitler should decide on war he will have to wage it against the USSR and the Western democracies.
Uribe remained Minister of Agriculture until 1 February 1939.

Later career
Uribe left Spain after the defeat of the Republic, and by late 1939 had reached Mexico. The party decided to form a secretariat in Mexico that included Uribe, Antonio Mije, Pedro Checa, Santiago Carrillo, Joan Comorera, Fernando Claudín and others. Uribe led the PCE group in Mexico during World War II (1939–1945).
He became second in the overall PCE leadership after Jesús Hernández Tomás was expelled from the party in 1944.

Uribe moved from Mexico to Paris with Antonio Mije in May 1946.
Dolores Ibárruri withdrew due to sickness in the summer of 1947, and Uribe and Mije began feuding with Francisco Antón and Carrillo.
Moscow gave Uribe and Claudín the role of judges in the purge of PCE leadership that began in November 1947.
On 7 September 1950 the Spanish communists were outlawed in France.
Uribe moved to Prague, Czechoslovakia with Mije and Enrique Líster, while Carrillo and Antón remained underground in Paris.

Joseph Stalin died in March 1953 and in July 1953 Antón was thrown out of the Political Bureau, leaving Uribe, Ibárruri and Carrillo as the PCE leaders.
These three led the 5th PCE Congress in Czechoslovakia in September 1954.
Carrillo began maneuvering for greater power.

After Nikita Khrushchev denounced Stalin, Ibárruri abandoned Uribe and began to support Carrillo.
In February 1956 Uribe was denounced at the post-Stalinist 20th Congress of the Communist Party of the Soviet Union in Moscow.
Both Ibárruri and Uribe were accused of the "cult of personality" by Fernando Claudín and Carrillo, but Uribe was the main target.
He was eliminated from the PCE executive in the central committee plenary session of July–August 1956.

Vicente Uribe died in Prague on 11 July 1961.

Publications

Notes

Sources

 

1902 births
1961 deaths
Politicians from Bilbao
Communist Party of Spain politicians
Agriculture ministers of Spain
Members of the Congress of Deputies of the Second Spanish Republic
Spanish people of the Spanish Civil War (Republican faction)
Exiles of the Spanish Civil War in France
Exiles of the Spanish Civil War in Mexico